Vyezdnoye is an urban locality (a work settlement) in Arzamassky District of Nizhny Novgorod Oblast, Russia, located on the left (southwestern) bank of the Tyosha River, opposite the city of Arzamas,  south of Nizhny Novgorod. Population:

History
It was granted urban-type settlement status in 1982.

References

Urban-type settlements in Nizhny Novgorod Oblast
Arzamassky District
Arzamassky Uyezd